The state of Andhra Pradesh held urban local bodies elections on 30 March 2014. This included 10 Municipal Corporations, and 145 Municipal Councils and Nagar Panchayats (Notified Area Council). 
Elections in the remaining bodies were not held due to issues such as court cases, delays in the preparation of electoral rolls, problems in the delimitation of wards, and the creation of new bodies.

Background 
On 3 February, the High Court criticized the government for not conducting the local bodies' elections despite clear directions to do so. The Court threatened to take action against the Chief Secretary of the state if they failed to comply with the orders. Despite going to the Supreme Court, the government received no respite. On 3 March, the State Election Commissioner announced that the elections would not receive the Governor's permission, due to the President's rule in the state.

These were the last local body elections in the soon-to-be bifurcated state.

Election schedule

Election results 
Initially, the results were to be declared on 2 April. However, due to concern from certain political parties that the results could influence voters in the coming assembly and parliamentary elections, they were postponed until 12 May.

Party Wise Results

Results in Andhra Pradesh 
Direct elections

Indirect elections to mayor

Results in Telangana 
Direct elections

Indirect elections to mayor

References

Notes

External links 

Local elections in Andhra Pradesh
Local government in Andhra Pradesh
2010s in Andhra Pradesh
2014 elections in India